Tulki Tappehsi (also Romanized as Tūlkī Tappehsī; also known as Tūlkī) is a village in Chaldoran-e Jonubi Rural District, in the Central District of Chaldoran County, West Azerbaijan Province, Iran. At the 2006 census, its population was 60, in 13 families.

References 

Populated places in Chaldoran County